Beydiğin is a village in the District of Manavgat, Antalya Province, Turkey.

History
Skirt first history of the neighborhood dates back to the 16th century. 
A primary school was opened in 1940. 93 men of the neighborhood served in the first world war with many killed. In 2000 the population was 489.

Today the village economy is based on agriculture and animal husbandry, especially beekeeping. The town has a primary schools, drinking water but there is no sewerage system.  There is no health centers nor post office but asphalt roads connecting the neighborhood and electricity and landline telephone.

References

Villages in Manavgat District